Charles O'Connor (October 26, 1878 – November 15, 1940) was an American lawyer and politician who served as the U.S. representative for Oklahoma's 1st congressional district from 1929 to 1931. He was a member of the Republican Party.

Biography
O'Connor was born on a farm near Edina, Knox County, Missouri son of Charles and Catherine (née McCarthy) O'Connor, and attended the rural schools. He graduated from the State Teachers' College, Greeley, Colorado, in 1901 and from the law department of the University of Colorado at Boulder in 1904. Admitted to the bar the same year, he commenced practice in Boulder, Colorado. In 1905 he married Elizabeth Buell. They had three sons, one of whom died at a young age.

Career
From 1911 to 1913, O'Connor was the first Assistant Attorney General of Colorado. He became city attorney of Boulder from 1917 through 1918; and then moved to Tulsa, Oklahoma, in 1919. There he continued the practice of his profession.

Elected as a Republican member of the United States House of Representatives for one term, O'Connor served from March 4, 1929 to March 3, 1931.  He was unsuccessful in his re-election attempt, and resumed his law practice in Tulsa, Oklahoma. He moved back to Boulder, Colorado, in 1936 because of his failing health.

Death
O'Connor died of pneumonia in Denver, Colorado, on November 15, 1940, and is interred at Green Mountain Cemetery, Boulder, Colorado.

References

External links
Biographical Directory of the United States Congress

1878 births
1940 deaths
Republican Party members of the United States House of Representatives from Oklahoma
Deaths from pneumonia in Colorado